Peter Kenneth Evison (born 27 May 1964) is an English former professional darts player who competed in Professional Darts Corporation (PDC) and British Darts Organisation (BDO) events. Nicknamed The Fen Tiger, his greatest achievements were winning the 1989 Winmau World Masters and the 1996 World Matchplay.

Darts career

BDO
Before appearing in a major tournament, Evison was a contestant on Bullseye. He, along with his teammate, failed however, to get to Bully's prize board. Evison later appeared on the show in which he scored 300 points on the "Pounds for points" charity round. Evison appeared on the show again in 1989, scoring 323 points in 9 darts in the "Pounds for points" round.

Evison burst on the darts scene in 1986 with a surprise victory over John Lowe in the British Professional Championship, a major televised tournament in that era.

Evison made his World Championship debut in 1988, and went on to reach the quarter-finals, before losing to the eventual champion, Bob Anderson. Evison returned to the same stage the following year, only to be defeated by Eric Bristow in a close quarter-final match. Evison avenged this defeat in the final of the prestigious Winmau World Masters later in 1989, to take the title. However, 1989 was the year of the big slump in darts' television coverage and prize money. As a result, Evison's 1989 World Masters win was not televised, and he received only half of the prize money that the 1988 World Masters champion, Bob Anderson, had received for winning the tournament the year before Evison. Evison was one of the tournament favourites to win the 1990 World Championship. However, despite hitting a 170 checkout, Evison was beaten in the first round by Jack McKenna. Evison had a dip in form at the World Championship between 1990 and 1992, failing to get to the quarter finals in any of the three, despite a first round win over John Lowe in 1991. Evison failed to qualify for the last unified World Championship in 1993.

PDC
Evison was one of the top players who left the British Darts Organisation to form the World Darts Council (now the Professional Darts Corporation, PDC). Evison reached the semi-final of the inaugural 1994 PDC World Darts Championship losing to eventual champion, Dennis Priestley.

Rod Harrington halted him in the semi-final of the 1995 PDC World Darts Championship. A quarter-final defeat followed in 1996, before he reached (and lost) his third semi-final in the 1997 PDC World Darts Championship. There was a third-placed play-off in that year and he beat Eric Bristow to finish third. Evison also got to the quarter-finals of the 1998 PDC World Darts Championship, losing to Harrington.

Evison failed to pass the first round of the 1999 World Championships, but reached the quarter-finals again in 2000 – losing this time to Peter Manley. For the next four years Evison lost in the first round as his career began to fade. He managed one preliminary round win in 2005 at Purfleet, before being badly beaten in a grudge match against Andy Jenkins. It was Evison's last appearance in the tournament.

Evison's best performances in the PDC came during the week in which he won the 1996 World Matchplay. He beat the defending champion, Phil Taylor, 8–1 in the second round, and beat Dennis Priestley 16–14 in the final to clinch the title, averaging over 100 in both matches. The defence of his title the following year ended with a quarter-final loss to Richie Burnett. He had further quarter-final appearances in 1999 and 2003, but he also suffered a humiliating 10–0 whitewash in the 2004 World Matchplay to Ronnie Baxter which was his last appearance in Blackpool.

Evison also reached the semi-final of the World Grand Prix in 2002 but lost 0–6 to Phil Taylor.

With his PDC world ranking falling rapidly, Evison was forced to qualify for all the PDC darts tournaments, which he failed to do for the World Championship in 2006, 2007 and 2008.

In 2008, it was announced that Evison was one of eight players to take part in the BetFred League of Legends alongside the likes of Bristow, Bobby George and Lowe. He would go on to reach the semi finals of the tournament. It was also announced that Evison had re-joined the BDO system, becoming one of only a handful of players to return to the BDO after switching to the rival PDC. Evison took part in the BDO International Open on 15 June 2008, receiving a bye into the second round before losing to Paul Hanvidge 3–2 in legs. He reached the last 16 of the Czech Open in November 2008.

In 2009, Evison reached the last 16 of both the Isle of Man Open and the Open Holland.  He then reached the quarter finals of the Swiss Open, his best performance since returning to the BDO.

In 2012, Evison attempted to rejoin the PDC via the Qualifying School but failed to earn a tour card.

In 2018, Evison quit the PDC Challenge Tour.

Personal life
In 1986, Peter married wife Angie, who died in 2012.

World Championship results

BDO

 1988: Quarter-finals (lost to Bob Anderson 0–4) (sets) 
 1989: Quarter-finals (lost to Eric Bristow 3–4)
 1990: 1st round (lost to Jack McKenna 1–3)
 1991: 2nd round (lost to Kevin Kenny 1–3)
 1992: 1st round (lost to Keith Sullivan 1–3)

PDC

 1994: Semi-finals (lost to Dennis Priestley 3–5)
 1995: Semi-finals (lost to Rod Harrington 1–5)
 1996: Quarter-finals (lost to John Lowe 2–4)
 1997: Semi-finals (lost to Dennis Priestley 4–5)
 1998: Quarter-finals (lost to Rod Harrington 0–4)
 1999: 1st round (lost to Dennis Smith 0–3)
 2000: Quarter-finals (lost to Peter Manley 1–5)
 2001: 1st round (lost to Dennis Smith 0–3)
 2002: 1st round (lost to Richie Burnett 1–4)
 2003: 2nd round (lost to Wayne Mardle 3–4)
 2004: 3rd round (lost to Colin Lloyd 1–4)
 2005: 3rd round (lost to Andy Jenkins 0–4)

Career finals

BDO major finals: 1 (1 title)

PDC major finals: 1 (1 title)

Independent major finals: 1 (1 runner-up)

Performance timeline

External links
Darts Database – Peter Evison profile

English darts players
1964 births
Living people
People from Chiswick
People from West Drayton
Sportspeople from London
Professional Darts Corporation founding players
British Darts Organisation players
World Matchplay (darts) champions